Gurur is a small village in Mysore district, Karnataka, India.

Location
Gurur is located on the south of Mysore city.  It is at a distance of 7.9 km from Mysore city.

Transportation
Bus No. 11-A goes to Gurur from the city bus station, passing through Jayaprakash Nagar and Vidyaranyapura. The nearest railway station is in Ashokapuram, Mysore. Gurur has a post office and its pincode is 570008.

Nearby villages
 Ramabhai Nagar
 Sidhappa complex
 Mahadevapura
 D.Block
 Gobli Mara
 Kalalavadi
 Udburu

Demographics
At the 2011 census, Gurur had a population of 2,292 people, of which 1,171 are males and the rest are females.  Children below six years made up 11 per cent of the total population.
The literacy rate is 68 per cent.

Administration
Gorur is administered by a village head called Sarpanch who is elected by the people every five years.

Major Landmarks
 S.S.E.T. National Public school, Gurur
 World Peace Centre
 Institute for Indian Art and Culture
 Kalalavadi

See also
 Jayaprakash Nagar
 Vidyaranyapuram
 Gorur, Hassan

Image Gallery

References

Mysore South
Suburbs of Mysore